The Newport Reading Room (also known as The Reading Room), founded in 1854, is a gentlemen's club located on Bellevue Avenue in Newport, Rhode Island, USA. Its primary building features an actual book reading room. The Spouting Rock Beach Association, which owns the famed Bailey's Beach, has been reported to own the building. However this claim, according to the club's leadership, is incorrect.

History
The Newport Reading Room was founded in 1854 by William Shepard Wetmore, a wealthy China trade merchant, and several other notable Newporters, including Yankee traders and Southern planters who summered in Newport. Several of the managing stock holders were full-time Rhode Island residents while others were summer residents. Supposedly, the Newport Casino, a rival club nearby on Bellevue Avenue was started by a former Reading Room member, James Gordon Bennett, Jr., as described:
The Newport Reading Room incident concerns Bennett and one of his polo buddies, Captain Candy, better known as "Sugar Candy." A wager was concocted whereby Sugar Candy would mount his polo pony and ride up the short flight of stairs into the exclusive club located on Bellevue Avenue. Bennett was reprimanded, Sugar Candy supposedly shown the door for the last time. As the story goes (never proven), Bennett started the Newport Casino in response.Sports Illustrated, Sept. 2, 1968 (accessed Oct. 8, 2009)
The Reading Room has a long history of hosting charitable fundraisers, for example the New York Times reported on the club's 1912 baseball game against the U.S. Navy officers of the Atlantic Fleet to raise funds for Newport Hospital. The Reading Room was one of the centers of Newport social life with other traditional institutions such as the Redwood Library, Newport Country Club, Trinity Church, Bailey's Beach, New York Yacht Club summer clubhouse and the Newport Casino

Notable Stockholder Members
There are several categories of membership that include Stockholders, those who are eligible to vote; annual subscribers, resident and non-resident; and junior members.
 Henry H. Anderson, Jr.
 Vincent Astor
 George F. Baker
 James Gordon Bennett, Jr.
 John Nicholas Brown
 Rear Admiral Henry E. Eccles
 Elbridge T. Gerry
 Robert Goelet Sr.
 John N. A. Griswold
 Theodore Havemeyer
 Vice Admiral John T. Hayward
 Thomas Wentworth Higginson
 Arthur Curtiss James
 George Noble Jones
 William Beach Lawrence
 Lewis Cass Ledyard
 Pierre Lorillard
 Charles May Oelrichs
 Duncan Pell
 Claiborne Pell
 Frederick H. Prince
 Cornelius Vanderbilt II
 Harold S. Vanderbilt
 William Shepard Wetmore
 Rear Admiral J.C. Wylie

See also
 List of American gentlemen's clubs
 Newport Casino
 Newport Country Club

References

External links
https://www.golocalprov.com/news/An-Ugly-Anti-Semitic-Episode-in-Newport-When-a-Club-Wanted-Throw-Out-a-Jewi
RI Supreme Court Case, In re Newport Reading Room et al., 21 RI 440 (1899)

1854 establishments in Rhode Island
Clubs and societies in the United States
Gentlemen's clubs in the United States
Organizations established in 1854